Pålsson is a Swedish-language surname. Notable people with the surname include:

Johnny Påhlsson (1941 – 2009), Swedish sport shooter 
 (1935-2019),  Swedish writer focusing on heraldry and phalewristics
Samuel Påhlsson (born 1977),  Swedish former professional ice hockey player

Swedish-language surnames